GreatNonprofits is a 501(c)(3) registered non-profit organization based in the United States with a website where donors, volunteers, and clients to review and share their personal experiences with charitable organizations, essentially providing crowdsourced information about the reputability of these organizations. It was founded in 2007 by Perla Ni and has an operating budget of an estimated $750,000. 

GreatNonprofits is known for its "Top-Rated" awards which it grants to organizations that have maintained an average rating of 4.5 stars throughout the year. The group's website has ratings on around 6,500 nonprofits.

Media coverage

GreatNonprofits has been covered in The Economist, Christian Science Monitor, Good Magazine, and other news sources.

See also

 Candid
 Charity Navigator
 GiveWell
 Giving What We Can

References

External links
 GreatNonprofits official website

Charity review websites

Charities based in California
American review websites